South Bristol may refer to:
South Bristol, England, the southerly parts of the city of Bristol
 South Bristol, Maine, a town in the United States
 South Bristol, New York, a town in the United States

See also 
 Bristol South (UK Parliament constituency)